The Grand Ducal Family of Luxembourg constitutes the House of Luxembourg-Nassau, headed by the sovereign Grand Duke, and in which the throne of the grand duchy is hereditary. It consists of heirs and descendants of the House of Nassau-Weilburg, whose sovereign territories passed cognatically from the House of Nassau to the House of Bourbon-Parma, itself a branch of the Spanish Royal House which is agnatically a cadet branch of the House of Capet that originated in France, itself a derivative dynasty from the Robertians and the founding house of the Capetian dynasty.

History
In 1443 the last member of the senior branch of the House of Luxemburg, Duchess Elisabeth, sold the Duchy of Luxembourg to Duke Philip the Good of Burgundy, a prince of the French House of Valois. In 1477 the duchy passed by marriage of Philip's granddaughter, Mary of Burgundy, to Archduke Maximilian I of Austria of the House of Habsburg. Luxembourg was one of the fiefdoms in the former Burgundian Netherlands which  Maximilian and Mary's grandson, Emperor Charles V, combined into an integral union, the Seventeen Provinces, by issuing the Pragmatic Sanction of 1549. The southern Netherlands remained part of the Habsburg Empire, first held by the Spanish branch and then by the Austrian line, until 1794 when French revolutionaries replaced Habsburg rule with French hegemony until the defeat of Napoleon.

Luxembourg's territories, centering on the ancestral castle, were captured from occupying French forces in the first stages of the fall of Napoleon. Some were eventually ceded to William VI of Nassau, Prince of Orange, who had been declared Sovereign Prince of the Netherlands in 1813, by his cousin King Frederick William III of Prussia who annexed other territories which had been held by princes of the various branches of the House of Nassau.
The Great Powers agreed at the Congress of Vienna in 1815 to re-constitute and elevate Luxembourg into a grand duchy, to be hereditary in the male line of the entire House of Nassau, beginning with the Prince of Orange, who was simultaneously but separately recognised as King of the Netherlands.

Thus William I of the Netherlands ascended the grand ducal throne as the first Grand Duke of Luxemburg. When the male line of the House of Orange-Nassau became extinct in 1890, the crown of the Netherlands went to his descendant, Wilhelmina of Orange-Nassau, but the crown of Luxembourg continued in the male line, devolving upon the head of the only surviving branch of the House of Nassau, ex-Duke Adolf of Nassau-Weilburg. His son, Guillaume IV (reigned 1905–1912), left no sons and was succeeded by his daughters, Marie-Adélaïde and then by Charlotte (reigned 1919–1964). Her descendants (from her marriage to Prince Felix of Bourbon-Parma) comprise the Grand Ducal House in the 21st century.

Titulature
The monarch bears the style of Royal Highness (subsumed in the higher style of Majesty that was borne by its sovereigns during the personal union of the Grand Duchy with the Kingdom of the Netherlands until 1890), to which the heir apparent is also entitled. The other male-line descendants of Grand Duke Adolphe held the titles "Prince/Princess of Luxembourg" and "Prince/Princess of Nassau", with the style of Grand Ducal Highness. Until 1995, the daughters and male-line issue of Grand Duchess Charlotte also bore the title of "Prince/Princess of Bourbon-Parma" and were addressed as Royal Highness, in right of their descent from her consort, Prince Felix of Bourbon-Parma.

On 28 July 1987, by grand ducal decree, members of the dynasty assumed the surname "de Nassau" and discontinued use of the princely title and inescutcheon of the House of Bourbon-Parma (the Dukes of which had not consented to the marriages to commoners of the dynasts of their Luxembourg cadet branch, Prince Charles in 1967 and Hereditary Grand Duke Henri in 1981), while retaining the style of Royal Highness.

Since the grand ducal decree of 21 September 1995, dynasts who are the children of a Grand Duke or Hereditary Grand Duke hold the titles "Prince/Princess of Luxembourg" and "Prince/Princess of Nassau" with the style of Royal Highness. Shortly after his accession to the throne in October 2000, Grand Duke Henri issued a grand ducal decree conferring upon his eldest son and heir, Prince Guillaume, the title of "Hereditary Grand Duke" and restoring to him the title "Prince of Bourbon-Parma". Male line descendants of Grand Duchess Charlotte who are not the children of a Grand Duke or Hereditary Grand Duke are "Prince/Princess of Nassau" with the style of His/Her Royal Highness.

A grand ducal decree in 2012, concerning the family pact, further defined the rules of titles borne.

The wives, children and male-line descendants of a prince of the dynasty whose marriage has not received grand ducal consent are "Count/Countess de Nassau".

Religion
Grand Dukes Adolphe (1817–1905) and William IV (1852–1912) were Evangelical Christians. William married the Roman Catholic Marie Anne of Portugal, believing that a country in which the great majority of people were Roman Catholic should also have a Roman Catholic monarch. In 1907, William declared the Evangelical Counts of Merenberg to be non-dynastic and named his own Roman Catholic daughter, Marie-Adélaïde (1894–1924), heiress to the grand ducal throne; she in 1919 abdicated in favour of her sister, Charlotte (1896–1985), who was also Roman Catholic, and Charlotte's Roman Catholic descendants have reigned in Luxembourg ever since.

However, although Roman Catholicism is the claimed faith of the overwhelming majority of the Luxembourgish people (ca. 90-93%), it does not have the status of a State religion, nor is there any legal or constitutional obligation for the Grand Duke (as head of state) to be Roman Catholic.

Members

Henri is the current Grand Duke of Luxembourg. He was born on 16 April 1955. He was married on 14 February 1981 to Maria Teresa Mestre y Batista, now Grand Duchess Maria Teresa of Luxembourg; and became Grand Duke when his father, Jean, abdicated on 7 October 2000. Their children are:
Guillaume is the Hereditary Grand Duke of Luxembourg, the Grand Duke's eldest son, born on 11 November 1981. He was married on 20 October 2012 to Countess Stephanie of Lannoy, now Hereditary Grand Duchess Stephanie of Luxembourg, (b. 18 February 1984).
Prince Charles, the Hereditary Grand Duke's son, was born on 10 May 2020 at the Grand Duchess Charlotte Maternity Hospital in Luxembourg City.
Prince Félix of Luxembourg, the Grand Duke's second son, born on 3 June 1984. He was married on 21 September 2013 to Claire Lademacher, now Princess Claire of Luxembourg, (b. 21 March 1985). They have a daughter and a son together:
 Princess Amalia of Nassau, Prince Félix's daughter, was born on 15 June 2014 at the Grand Duchess Charlotte Maternity Hospital in Luxembourg City.
Prince Liam of Nassau, Prince Félix's son, was born on 28 November 2016 in Geneva, Switzerland.
Prince Louis of Luxembourg, the Grand Duke's third son, born on 3 August 1986. He was married on 29 September 2006 to Tessy Antony, later Princess Tessy of Luxembourg until divorce, (b. 28 October 1985). Upon marrying, Prince Louis renounced his right of succession prior to his marriage. Prince Louis and Antony divorced on 4 April 2019.
 Prince Gabriel of Nassau, Prince Louis's eldest son, was born out of wedlock in Switzerland on 12 March 2006.
 Prince Noah of Nassau, Prince Louis's youngest son, was born on 21 September 2007 at the Grand Duchess Charlotte Maternity Hospital in Luxembourg City.
Princess Alexandra of Luxembourg, the Grand Duke's daughter, born on 16 February 1991.
Prince Sébastien of Luxembourg, the Grand Duke's youngest son, born on 16 April 1992.

Extended family
Princess Marie Astrid of Luxembourg, now Archduchess Marie Astrid of Austria, the Grand Duke's eldest sister, was born on 17 February 1954. She was married on 6 February 1982 to Archduke Carl Christian of Austria, who was born in 1954.  They have five children.
Prince Jean of Luxembourg, the Grand Duke's brother, was born on 15 May 1957. He was married on 27 May 1987 to Hélène Vestur, later Countess Hélène of Nassau until divorce, who was born in 1958. On 26 September 1986, Prince Jean renounced his right of succession to the Luxembourg throne. His children were styled as Count(ess) of Nassau until given the title HRH Prince(ss) of Nassau on 24 November 2004. Prince Jean and Vestur divorced in 2004 and, on 18 March 2009, he married Diane de Guerre, now Countess Diane of Nassau, in a civil ceremony in Roermond, the Netherlands.
 Princess Marie Gabrielle of Nassau, Prince Jean's daughter, was born out of wedlock on 8 September 1986. Married Antonius Willms in 2017. She had 2 sons.
 Prince Constantin  of Nassau, Prince Jean's eldest son, was born on 22 July 1988. He married Kathryn Mechie, now Princess Kathryn of Nassau, in 2020, had 2 children.
 Prince Felix of Nassau, Prince Constantin's son, born out of wedlock on 22 Abril 2018.
 Princess Cosima of Nassau, Prince Constantin's daughter, born on 13 May 2022.
 Prince Wenceslas of Nassau, Prince Jean's second son, was born on 17 November 1990.
 Prince Carl Johann of Nassau, Prince Jean's third son and youngest child, was born on 15 August 1992. He married Ivanna Jamin (b. 1994), now Princess Ivanna of Nassau, in 2019, had 1 son.
 Prince Xander of Nassau, Prince Carl Johann's son, born in 2021.
 Princess Margaretha of Luxembourg, now Princess Margaretha of Liechtenstein, the Grand Duke's youngest sister. She was born on 15 May 1957. She was married on 20 March 1982 to Prince Nikolaus of Liechtenstein, who was born in 1947. They have had three surviving children.
 Prince Guillaume of Luxembourg, the Grand Duke's youngest brother, was born on 1 May 1963. He was married on 8 September 1994 to Sibilla Sandra Weiller (the daughter of Donna Olimpia Torlonia dei principi di Civitella-Cesi and Paul-Annik Weiller, and great-granddaughter of Alfonso XIII of Spain), now Princess Sibilla of Luxembourg.
 Prince Paul-Louis of Nassau, Prince Guillaume's eldest son, was born on 4 March 1998.
 Prince Léopold of Nassau, Prince Guillaume's second son, was born on 2 May 2000. He is the twin brother of Princess Charlotte.
 Princess Charlotte of Nassau, Prince Guillaume's only daughter, was born on 2 May 2000. She is the twin sister of Prince Léopold.
 Prince Jean André of Nassau, Prince Guillaume's youngest son, was born on 13 July 2004.
 Princess Joan of Luxembourg (née Dillon), the Grand Duke's aunt, was born on 31 January 1935. She was widow of Prince Charles of Luxembourg they married on 1 March 1967. They have issue:
 Princess Charlotte of Luxembourg, the Grand Duke's first cousin, was born on 15 September 1967. She was married in 1993 to Marc Victor Cunningham, who was born on 24 September 1965. They have issue.
 Prince Robert of Luxembourg, the Grand Duke's first cousin, was born on 14 August 1968 and married religiously on 19 September 1993 to Julie Elizabeth Houston Ongaro, now Princess Julie of Nassau, who was born on 9 June 1966. They have issue.
 Princess Charlotte of Nassau. Prince Robert's daughter, born 20 March 1995.
 Prince Alexandre of Nassau, Prince Robert's eldest son, born 18 April 1997.
 Prince Frederik of Nassau, Prince Robert's youngest son, born 18 March 2002.

Succession to the throne

The preference for men over women in succession to Luxembourg's throne was abandoned in favour of absolute primogeniture on 20 June 2011 by decree of Grand Duke Henri.
Henceforth, any legitimate female descendant of the House of Luxembourg-Nassau born of authorized marriage shall inherit the throne by order of seniority of line of descent and of birth as stipulated in Article 3 of the Constitution and the Nassau Family Pact without regard to gender, applicable first to succession by the descendants of Grand Duke Henri. The Grand Duke's Marshal issued an addendum to the decree explaining the context of the change: pursuant to the United Nations' 1979 call for nations to eliminate all forms of discrimination against women, in 2008 the Grand Duchy dropped the exception to gender non-discrimination it had declared in the matter of the grand ducal succession.

Summary family tree
For the ancestry of the House of Nassau, see Family Tree of the House of Nassau.

Arms
See also: Category:SVG coats of arms of Luxembourg

A complete armorial is given at the Armorial de la Maison de Nassau, section Lignée Valramienne at the French Wikipedia, and another one at Wapen van Nassau, Tak van Walram at the Dutch Wikipedia.

See also
 List of Grand Dukes of Luxembourg
 Line of succession to the throne of Luxembourg

References

Modern history of Luxembourg
Luxembourgish monarchy
National symbols of Luxembourg
House of Luxembourg-Nassau